We Like to Rock is a compilation album by the Canadian rock band April Wine, released in 1988. It is a repackaging for the U.S. market of the 1979 album Harder.....Faster with a reordering of the songs and a different cover.

Track listing
All tracks written by Myles Goodwyn unless otherwise noted.
 "I Like to Rock" – 3:41
 "21st Century Schizoid Man" (R. Fripp, M. Giles, G. Lake, I. McDonald, P. Sinfield) – 6:49
 "Babes in Arms" – 3:26
 "Say Hello" – 3:10
 "Before the Dawn" (B. Greenway) – 4:37
 "Better Do it Well" (M. Goodwyn, G. Moffet) – 3:48
 "Tonite" – 4:07
 "Ladies Man" – 3:50

Personnel
 Myles Goodwyn – vocals, guitars
 Brian Greenway – vocals, guitars
 Gary Moffet – guitars, background vocals
 Steve Lang – bass, background vocals
 Jerry Mercer – drums, background vocals

References

1988 greatest hits albums
April Wine albums
Albums produced by Myles Goodwyn
Aquarius Records (Canada) compilation albums
Capitol Records compilation albums
Albums produced by Nick Blagona